German submarine U-157 was a Type IXC U-boat of Nazi Germany's Kriegsmarine during World War II. The submarine was laid down on 21 October 1940 at the DeSchiMAG AG Weser yard in Bremen, launched on 5 June 1941, and commissioned on 15 September under the command of Korvettenkapitän Wolf Henne. After training with the 4th U-boat Flotilla, U-157 was transferred to the 2nd U-boat Flotilla for front-line service on 3 June 1942.

Design
German Type IXC submarines were slightly larger than the original Type IXBs. U-157 had a displacement of  when at the surface and  while submerged. She had two shafts and two  propellers.

U-157 was fitted with six  torpedo tubes (four fitted at the bow and two at the stern), 22 torpedoes, one  SK C/32 naval gun, 180 rounds, and a  SK C/30 as well as a  C/30 anti-aircraft gun. The boat had a complement of forty-eight.

Service history

First patrol
U-157 sailed from Kiel on 30 April 1942, around the British Isles, and arrived at Lorient, France, eleven days later on 10 May.

Second patrol
The U-boat left Lorient on 18 May 1942 and sailed across the Atlantic to the Caribbean Sea. There, on 11 June, she torpedoed and sank the unescorted 6,401 GRT American tanker Hagan about five miles off the north coast of Cuba. The ship, loaded with 22,676 barrels of blackstrap molasses, was hit in the engine room, destroying the engines and causing at least one boiler to explode. About a minute later a second torpedo struck, and the tanker began to sink by the stern. The crew abandoned ship in two lifeboats, but two officers and four crewmen were lost. The boats, containing 38 men, both landed in Cuba.

Fate
All 52 crew were lost.

Summary of raiding history

References

Notes

Bibliography

Further reading

External links

German Type IX submarines
Ships built in Bremen (state)
1941 ships
U-boats commissioned in 1941
World War II submarines of Germany
U-boats sunk in 1942
U-boats sunk by depth charges
U-boats sunk by US warships
U-157
Ships lost with all hands
Maritime incidents in June 1942